The following units of the U.S. Army and state militia forces under Indiana Governor William Henry Harrison, fought against the Native American warriors of Tecumseh's Confederacy, led by Chief Tecumseh's brother, Tenskwatawa "The Prophet" at the battle of Tippecanoe on November 7, 1811.

Abbreviations used
 w = wounded
 k = killed
 m = missing

United States
Governor William Henry Harrison, Commander-in-Chief
 Second-in-Command - Acting Brig. Gen. John Parker Boyd
 Aide-de-camp - Col. Abraham Owen (k)

Headquarters
 Yellow Jackets - Capt. Spier Spencer (k)
 Spies and Guides - Capt. Toussaint Dubois

Tecumseh's Confederacy
Tenskwatawa (500-700 warriors)

Wea - White Loon (Wawpawwawqua)
Potawatomi - Winamac
Miami - Stone Eater

References

Sources
 as read to the Filson Club.

Tippecanoe
Orders of battle